Langsett is a village and civil parish near Penistone in South Yorkshire. It lies near the southern edge of the Metropolitan Borough of Barnsley and on the edge of the Peak District National Park. At the 2001 census it had a population of 161, increasing to 222 at the 2011 Census.

In the early Medieval period, Langsett was known as Penisale. It held a royal charter entitling it to hold a weekly market on Tuesdays and an annual three-day fair, but these were held somewhere in the country rather than in the village itself. The market charter was later used to start a market in Penistone.

A tradition associates the location of Penisale market with a cross near the junction of Cross Lane and Hartcliffe Road. This theory is rejected by Neville T. Sharpe, who holds that this was a wayside cross used as a guide by travellers.

In chronostratigraphy, the British sub-stage of the Carboniferous period, the 'Langsettian' derives its name from a study of geological exposures in the banks of the Little Don River near Langsett.

The Peak District Boundary Walk runs through the village.

See also
Listed buildings in Langsett

References

External links
 Langsett Parish Council Website

Villages in South Yorkshire
Towns and villages of the Peak District
Geography of the Metropolitan Borough of Barnsley
Civil parishes in South Yorkshire